Joseph Griffith Golding (March 26, 1921December 26, 1971) was a professional American Football halfback/defensive back in the National Football League. He played for the Boston Yanks (1947–1948) and the New York Bulldogs/Yanks (1949–1951).

His 1951 Bowman football card #115 relates the following: "In the service for 44 months. Won Silver Star, Bronze Star, Purple Heart. Commissioned on the battlefield while an infantry-man in Europe".

Golding's brother, also named Joe Golding, was a longtime high school football coach who led Wichita Falls High to four state championships.  The field at Wichita Falls' Memorial Stadium was named in his honor and he was posthumously elected to the Texas High School Football Hall of Fame in 1988.  His grand-nephew is current UTEP basketball coach Joe Golding.

References 

1921 births
1971 deaths
People from Eufaula, Oklahoma
Players of American football from Oklahoma
American football defensive backs
American football halfbacks
Oklahoma Sooners football players
Boston Yanks players
New York Bulldogs players
New York Yanks players
Recipients of the Silver Star
United States Army officers
United States Army soldiers